Wesa is a Pashto surname, found in Afghanistan.

Notable people with this surname include:

 Toryalai Wesa (born 1947), Afghan politician
 Zalmai Wesa (born 1947), Afghan politician

See also
 WESA (disambiguation)

Pashto-language surnames